The 2009–10 Minnesota Wild season was the team's tenth season in the National Hockey League (NHL). On May 22, Chuck Fletcher was named as the new general manager of the Wild, replacing Doug Risebrough. On June 16, the Wild named Todd Richards as the new head coach, replacing Jacques Lemaire, who had resigned from the position in April. On August 30, the Wild unveiled their new third jersey, which they debuted on October 21 against the Colorado Avalanche. The team ended its de facto policy of rotating the captaincy monthly by naming Mikko Koivu the team's permanent captain.

Preseason

Regular season 

The Wild allowed the most shorthanded goals in the League, with 13.

Divisional standings

Conference standings

Game log

Playoffs 

The Wild did not qualify for the 2010 Stanley Cup Playoffs, making it the second year in a row that they've missed the playoffs.

Player statistics

Skaters
Note: GP = Games played; G = Goals; A = Assists; Pts = Points; +/− = Plus/minus; PIM = Penalty minutes

Goaltenders
Note: GP = Games played; TOI = Time on ice (minutes); W = Wins; L = Losses; OT = Overtime losses; GA = Goals against; GAA= Goals against average; SA= Shots against; SV= Saves; Sv% = Save percentage; SO= Shutouts

†Denotes player spent time with another team before joining Wild. Stats reflect time with Wild only.
‡Traded mid-season. Stats reflect time with Wild only.

Awards and records

Awards

Records

Milestones

Transactions 
The Wild have been involved in the following transactions during the 2009–10 season.

Trades

Free agents acquired

Free agents lost

Claimed via waivers

Lost via waivers

Player signings

Draft picks 

Minnesota's picks at the 2009 NHL Entry Draft in Montreal, Quebec.

See also 
 2009–10 NHL season

Farm teams

References 

Minnesota Wild seasons
M
M